Kanchan Mullick is an Indian Bengali film and television actor and politician. In addition to the television show Janata Express, Kanchan has also acted in movies like Mahakaal and Ranjana Ami Ar Ashbona. He is also a Bengali theatre artist. He has worked in the theatre group Swapnasandhani. Mullick is an All India Trinamool Congress candidate at Uttarpara constituency in 2021 West Bengal Legislative Assembly election, and has won the seat.

Filmography
 Raktabeej (2023)
 Tonic (2021)
 Bony (2021)
 Bob Biswas (2021)
 Cholo Potol Tuli (2020)
 Dracula Sir (2020)
 Tiki-Taka (2020)
 Panther: Hindustan Meri Jaan (2019)
 Sagardwipey Jawker Dhan (2019)
 Teko (2019)
 Mahalaya (film) (2019)
 Jaanbaaz (2019)
 Shankar Mudi (2019)
 Sultan: The Saviour (2018) 
 Purnimar Chand (2018)
 Nimki Fulki (2017)
 Dhananjay (2017)
 Upendra Matte Baa (2017) (Kannada film)
 Curzoner Kalom (2017)
 Haripad Bandwala (2016)
 Byomkesh O Chiriyakhana (2016)
 Abhimaan (2016)
 Dhruva (2016) (Telugu film)
 Ko 2 (2016) (Tamil film)
 Zulfiqar (2016)
 Love Express (2016) ... Dulal
 Kelor Kirti (2016) ... Baba
 Jenana (2016)
 Rajkahini (2015)
 Shudhu Tomari Jonyo (2015) ... Rohan
 Shorts (2013) _ Produced by : Anurag Kashyap
 Yoddha (2014)
 Bachchan (2014)
 Window Connections (2014)
 Khiladi (2013)
 Golemale Pirit Koro Na (2013)
 Bawali Unlimited (28 December 2012)
 Kanchenjunga Express (2012)
 Bangal Ghoti Phataphati (2012) - Upcoming
 Bhallu Sardar (29 June 2012)
 Behalf bass Off Route E (2 March 2012)
 Goraay Gondogol (3 February 2012)
 Gosainbaganer Bhoot (9 December 2011)
 Hello Memsaheb (30 September 2011)
 Tomake Chai (22 July 2011)
 Ranjana Ami Ar Ashbona (24 June 2011)
 Janala (25 February 2011)
 Jiyo Kaka (11 February 2011)
 Bye Bye Bangkok (28 January 2011)
 Jor Jar Muluk Tar (2010)
 Lakshyabhed (2009)
 10:10 (28 November 2008)
 Bor Asbe Ekhuni  (2008)
 Mahakaal (2008)
 No Problem (2007) - Unreleased
 Shikar (2006)
 Raju Uncle (2005)
 Alo (2003) 
 Patal Ghar (2003) 
 Sangee (2003)
 Sathi'' (2002)

Web series

See also

 Kaushik Sen, Bengali actor
 Swapnasandhani, Bengali theatre group

References

External links

Male actors in Bengali cinema
Bengali male television actors
Living people
University of Calcutta alumni
Indian male stage actors
1970 births